WTS Sparta Wrocław, also known as Betard Sparta Wrocław for sponsorship reasons, are a motorcycle speedway team based in Wrocław, Poland. They were established in 1950. The team's home track is at the Olympic Stadium, which has a capacity of 13,000 people. The team currently competes in the Ekstraliga (the highest division) and have won the Team Speedway Polish Championship five times.

History

1951 to 1958 
During the 1951 Polish speedway season a team from Wrocław called Spójnia Wrocław was created to compete in the first league. The team finished last but performed much better in 1952, finishing 2nd. It is worth noting that a second club competed in Wrocław during the early 1950s but CWKS Wrocław was historically a Warsaw club and is not connected to this club.

Edward Kupczyński was the club's first star rider winning the 1952 Polish Individual Speedway Championship and the team won honours during the next seven consecutive years, winning silver and bronze medals in the Team Speedway Polish Championship from 1952 to 1958. The club also became known as Sparta Wrocław, with the exception of 1957 when the club competed as  Ślęza Wrocław. Mieczysław Połukard became Polish champion in 1954.

1959 to 1992 
After relegation in 1959 the team gained promotion back to the highest division after winning the Second League (West) in 1960. During the next three decades success became sparse with only three bronze medals won in 1963, 1967 and 1968 respectively. The team were renamed WTS (Wrocławskie Towarzystwo Sportowe) in 1992.

1993 to 1995 
During the 1993 Polish speedway season the club won the gold medal for the first time in their history. The team's averages improved significantly on 1992 and Tommy Knudsen, Dariusz Śledź, Piotr Baron and Wojciech Załuski were instrumental in helping win the league. The same team repeated the feat to win the gold medal in 1994 and 1995, with only Piotr Protasiewicz coming in during 1995.

1996 to 2014 

After a silver medal in 1999, Wrocław became inaugural members of the Ekstraliga in 2000. In 2006, the club won their fourth gold medal with a team led by Australian world champion Jason Crump. In 2012, the club signed Tai Woffinden.

2015 to present 
From 2015 the club remain one of the leading clubs in Poland, challenging on all fronts and have won three more Polish Pairs Speedway Championships, during the 2011 Polish speedway season, 2016 Polish speedway season and 2018 Polish speedway season. The club won a fifth gold medal during the 2021 Polish speedway season, with riders including Maciej Janowski, Artem Laguta, Tai Woffinden, Dan Bewley and Gleb Chugunov.

Teams

2023 team 
  Tai Woffinden
 / Artem Laguta
  Maciej Janowski
  Dan Bewley
  Piotr Pawlicki Jr.
  Francis Gusts
  Mateusz Panicz
  Bartłomiej Kowalski

Previous teams

2022 team

  Tai Woffinden
  Maciej Janowski
  Dan Bewley
 / Gleb Chugunov
  Lukas Baumann
  Michał Curzytek
  Bartłomiej Kowalski
  Mateusz Panicz
  Sandro Wassermann
  Nick Škorja
  Jack Smith
  Jakub Wiatrowski
  Dawid Rybak
  Jaroslav Vanicek

Notable riders

Honours

References 

Polish speedway teams
Sport in Wrocław